The Royal Air Force Officer and Aircrew Selection Centre, at Adastral Hall, RAF Cranwell, Lincolnshire, is the centre through which every potential RAF officer must go to be selected for Initial Officer Training (IOT) and through which potential non-commissioned aircrew must go to be selected for the Direct Entry Senior Non-commissioned Officer (DE-SNCO) course.

History

In 1947 the Aviation Candidate Selection Board was established at RAF Hornchurch following the closure of the Combined Selection Centre at RAF North Weald. In 1952 the name was changed to Aircrew Selection Centre. The centre closed with the airfield in 1962 and was transferred to RAF Biggin Hill. In 1992 it was decided to transfer the selection centre to its current location at RAF Cranwell.

Facilities 
The selection centre is attached to two large hangars, and there is a candidates' mess. The centre is home to everything required by a candidate during their selection. This includes a large aptitude testing centre, medical centre (including an optician and a hearing testing facility), interview rooms and syndicate rooms.

See also 
Potential Regiment Officers course (RAF Regiment)
Army Officer Selection Board (Army)
Admiralty Interview Board (Navy)

References

External links
RAF Website

North Kesteven District
Military history of Lincolnshire
Military units and formations established in 1992
Organisations based in Lincolnshire
Royal Air Force
Selection of British military officers